The Old Stone Chimney, is located in the city of Niagara Falls, New York.  It is a masonry chimney built as part of a two-story barracks on the site of the French "Fort du Portage," or "Fort Little Niagara," by Daniel Joncaire in 1750, when the Niagara River and its shores were part of New France on the North American continent.

The chimney has been repurposed several times since by British and American interests. Relocated three times (1902, 1942, and 2015), the Old Stone Chimney is currently located between the Niagara River and the Robert Moses Parkway east of the Adams Slip along the bike path on the river. Previously located in the former Porter Park on Buffalo Avenue, at the foot of 10th Street along an embankment of the Robert Moses Parkway, close to the exit ramp to John B. Daly Boulevard. The Old Stone Chimney is 31 feet tall and weighs approximately 60 tons.

Fort du Portage / Fort Little Niagara

Fort Little Niagara, built above the Falls of Niagara by French traders and military men, was once considered the third-most important fortification in New France, after Quebec and Fort Niagara. Built by Daniel Joncaire in 1750 at the southern terminus of the Niagara Portage,  the French burned the barracks and destroyed the fort in 1759 as British forces lay siege to Niagara in the French and Indian War. The Old Stone Chimney survived this fire.  British forces claimed victory at Fort Niagara in July 1759.  The Portage and its forts also reverted to British control.

Fort Schlosser

Before, during, and after the American Revolution and signing of the Jay Treaty, British forces maintained presence at what was rebuilt as Fort Schlosser until 1796, it was named for the first commanding officer at the site, Captain Joseph Schlosser. Portage Master John Stedman had lived in a house which utilized the Chimney from 1761 until that time. The British made improvements on the site and to The Portage, including the introduction of an incline tramway at the Niagara Escarpment and oxcarts to pull cargo,.  The utilization of these improvements disengaged native Seneca Indians, who had done the work manually under the French.  This led to the Devil's Hole Massacre on September 14, 1763, considered part of the Pontiac Rebellion.  Stedman was part of the British company and survived the massacre, and returned to his home on the banks of the Niagara River.

Private Ownership

Augustus Porter, one of Niagara's most prominent early settlers, occupied the Stedman House from 1806 to 1808, while he built a grand house overlooking the Niagara Rapids about a mile downriver.  Enos Broughton opened a tavern at the house with the Chimney in 1809. The tavern was leased to American military forces as hostilities escalated before the War of 1812. Along with most of the Niagara Frontier, the building was burned by the British in December 1813, in retaliation for the burning of Newark (now Niagara-On-The-Lake), Ontario earlier that month. 

In 1818 or 1819, the Chimney remaining on the site was re-used as Epaphroditus Emmons built an inn around it, but then moved the inn to another location after a few years. In 1840, the Chimney and land near it was repurchased by General Peter B. Porter (Augustus' brother), in whose stewardship it was incorporated as part of another house.  This house stayed in the Porter family until that building was torn down in 1889.

Public Domain

The land around the Chimney was purchased by the Niagara Falls Power Company in 1890, and the first public efforts to "save" the Old Stone Chimney began.  The 1891 campaign included the popularization of a song written by Niagara Falls historian Thomas Vincent Welch, a personal friend of Theodore Roosevelt.   The stones of the Chimney were marked and carefully moved in 1902, under the watchful eye of C. Breckenridge Porter, great-grandson of Peter Buell Porter. Due to wartime expansion of the Carborundum facility, the Chimney was in harm's way. It was moved again in 1942, again each stone numbered and replaced precisely, the work supervised carefully by local historian Edward T. Williams, the considerable cost was paid by the Niagara Power Company and Carborundum. Completion of the first section of New York State’s Robert Moses Parkway in 1962 did not provide for final relocation of the artifact. Cut off from the park in which it was placed, at the foot of a parkway embankment on private property (an industrial facility which has ceased operation).  Efforts to move the chimney are challenged by prohibitive costs.

As of November 2015 The Chimney has been relocated to the other side of the parkway.  The new site is accessible from the parkway with a small parking lot.  The bike path crosses in front of the chimney and the Niagara River is behind it.

References 

Buildings and structures in Niagara Falls, New York